William Matthew Makeham (11 September 1826 – 17 November 1891) was an English actuary and mathematician.

Makeham was responsible for proposing the age-independent Makeham term in the Gompertz–Makeham law of mortality that, together with the exponentially age-dependent Gompertz term, was one of the most effective theories to describe human mortality.

Makeham was responsible for two important studies on human mortality:

 
 

He had one wife, Hepzibah Reed, and seven children, William, Amy, Elizabeth, Thomas, Frederick, Emily, and George.

References

English mathematicians
British actuaries
1826 births
1891 deaths
19th-century British businesspeople